The Kreutzer Sonata (Italian:La sonata a Kreutzer) is a 1920 Italian silent film directed by Umberto Fracchia. The film is based Leo Tolstoy's 1889 novella of the same name. It is also known by the alternative title A Page from Life.

Cast
 Mario Mecchia 
 Lina Millefleurs
 Alfredo Sainati 
 Maria Tiflosi

References

Bibliography
 Aldo Bernardini & Vittorio Martinelli. Il cinema muto italiano: I film del dopoguerra, 1920. Nuova ERI, 1995.

External links

1920 films
Films directed by Umberto Fracchia
Italian silent feature films
Films based on The Kreutzer Sonata
Italian black-and-white films